Horst-Ulrich Hänel (born 3 June 1957 in Plau am See, Bezirk Schwerin) is a former field hockey player from West Germany, who twice won the silver medal at the Summer Olympics. He did so in 1984 (Los Angeles) and 1988 (Seoul).

References
sports-reference

External links
 

1957 births
Living people
People from Plau am See
People from Bezirk Schwerin
German male field hockey players
Sportspeople from Mecklenburg-Western Pomerania
Olympic field hockey players of West Germany
Field hockey players at the 1984 Summer Olympics
Field hockey players at the 1988 Summer Olympics
Olympic silver medalists for West Germany
Olympic medalists in field hockey
Medalists at the 1988 Summer Olympics
Medalists at the 1984 Summer Olympics
20th-century German people